2-haloacid dehalogenase (configuration-retaining) (2-haloalkanoic acid dehalogenase, 2-haloalkanoid acid halidohydrolase, DL-2-haloacid dehalogenase, DL-DEXr) is an enzyme with systematic name (S)-2-haloacid dehalogenase (configuration-retaining). This enzyme catalyses the following chemical reaction

 (1) (S)-2-haloacid + H2O  (S)-2-hydroxyacid + halide
 (2) (R)-2-haloacid + H2O  (R)-2-hydroxyacid + halide

Dehalogenates both (S)- and (R)-2-haloalkanoic acids to the corresponding (S)- and (R)-hydroxyalkanoic acids.

References

External links 
 

EC 3.8.1